Hans Krause, known by his stage name Hansi Kraus (born 26 June 1952 in Gliwice, Silesia, Poland), is a German actor.

Career 
Hans Krause was only 12 years old when he was discovered by German film producer Franz Seitz, Jr. Hans Krause sounds too Prussian to play a character created by Bavarian author Ludwig Thoma, so Seitz decided to use the screenname "Hansi Kraus". His first role was playing the Bavarian boy "Ludwig" in a film adaption of Ludwig Thoma's autobiographical stories. Due to his success the film  was followed by four installments. 

Besides these and other films he also starred a series of seven feature films about a young prankster called "Pepe Nietnagel". Some 25 years later, he again assumed the role of the now grown-up Pepe Nietnagel in the TV series Ein Schloß am Wörthersee.

In his films as a child actor he worked already regularly with a great many stars (including for example Uschi Glas, Peter Alexander, Rudi Carrell and Theo Lingen) and he has worked successfully as an actor ever since. As an adult he worked in main as a stage and television actor.

He is the father of actress Miriam Krause.

Filmography 

Kraus' filmography includes:

External links
 
 Hans Kraus at Crew United

1952 births
Living people
People from Gliwice
German male child actors
German male film actors
German male television actors
20th-century German male actors
21st-century German male actors